Portugal has participated in the Eurovision Song Contest 53 times since its debut at the 1964 contest. Since then it has missed five contests (and ). The contest is broadcast in Portugal by Rádio e Televisão de Portugal (RTP).

Having not appeared in the final since  and as holders of the record for most appearances in the contest without a win, Portugal won at the 49th attempt, when Salvador Sobral won the 2017 contest with the song "", Portugal's first top-five result in the contest. As hosts in 2018, the country finished last in the contest for a fourth time.

History

Portugal's debut entry was António Calvário with "". It was not a successful debut for the country, with Calvário coming last in the contest. Despite its last-place finish in the contest, "E depois do adeus" gained notability for being used as the radio musical signal to begin the Carnation Revolution against the Estado Novo regime, being played at 22:55 on 24 April 1974. Despite having some really weak results, the 90s were the most successful decade for the country, reaching the top 10 four times. Portugal had admission to take part in the 2000 and 2002 contest but refused. Its place was taken by Latvia both times, which ended up winning the contest in the latter year.

Since semi-finals were introduced in 2004, Portugal has failed to reach the final eight times, including from 2004 to 2007. In 2008, Vânia Fernandes finished 13th with the song "", Portugal's best result since 1996. The country continued to be present in the final until 2010. This was the third instance of a host country placing in the bottom five since . In , Portugal's first-ever entry sung entirely in English, "Love Is on My Side" by The Black Mamba, came in 12th place in the final. In , Maro with "" finished in ninth place in the final.

Absences 
Portugal has been absent from five contests since their first participation. The country's first absence was in 1970, where Portugal, along with four other countries, boycotted the contest due to the result of the previous year, when four countries were announced the winner.

Portugal missed the 2000 contest due to their poor average results over the past five years. Despite being eligible to enter the 2002 contest, RTP declined to enter, and was replaced by eventual winner Latvia.

The fourth absence was in 2013, when Portugal didn't participate for financial reasons.

The fifth absence was in 2016. RTP mentioned that this break was needed in order to facilitate a content renewal for its national selection for the Eurovision Song Contest, Festival da Canção.

Festival da Canção 

Festival da Canção (sometimes referred to as "Festival RTP da Canção") is the Portuguese national selection for the Eurovision Song Contest, organized by RTP, and is normally held between February and March of the year of the contest. It is one of the longest-running Eurovision selection methods. Previously a number of regional juries selected the winner, however, the winner has been selected through televoting in recent years. In 2009, 2010 and since 2017, a 50/50 system between regional juries and televoting has been used.

In the years when Portugal does not participate in the contest, the Festival da Canção was not held, except in two occasions: in 1970, when Portugal boycotted the contest, and in 2000, when the country was relegated.

Participation overview

Hostings

Awards

Marcel Bezençon Awards

Barbara Dex Award

Related involvement

Conductors

Additionally, there was an orchestra present at the Portuguese national final in 1999 and 2001, where the winning entries were conducted by José Marinho and Rui Filipe Reis, respectively.

Commentators and spokespersons

Comedy
In the late 1990s the English actor and comedian Steve Coogan created the character "Tony Ferrino" for his television comedy series. "Tony Ferrino" is supposedly a Portuguese singer and winner of the Eurovision Song Contest; he is a stereotype based on singers and entertainers often seen on European television programmes in the 1970s and 1980s. The BBC produced a one-off programme The Tony Ferrino Phenomenon in 1997.

Gallery

See also
Portugal in the Junior Eurovision Song Contest – Junior version of the Eurovision Song Contest.
Portugal in the Eurovision Dance Contest – Dance version of the Eurovision Song Contest.
Portugal in the Eurovision Young Dancers – A competition organised by the EBU for younger dancers aged between 16 and 21.
Portugal in the Eurovision Young Musicians – A competition organised by the EBU for musicians aged 18 years and younger.

Notes

References

 
Countries in the Eurovision Song Contest